George H. "Harry" Briggs (27 February 1923 – 2005) was a professional footballer who played as a centre half. He was born in Easington. He began his career in local football with Shotton Colliery's team and in November 1947 signed for Crystal Palace. He made 146 appearances (four goals) between then and 1955 when he retired as a player. Briggs died in 2005 aged 81 or 82.

References

External links

George Briggs at holmesdale.net

1923 births
2005 deaths
Sportspeople from Easington, County Durham
Footballers from County Durham
English footballers
Association football defenders
Shotton Colliery Welfare F.C. players
Crystal Palace F.C. players
English Football League players